Taylorsport is an unincorporated community in Boone County, Kentucky, in the United States.

History
Founded in 1827 as a warehouse and ferry crossing at the mouth of Elijah's Creek marked the beginning of Taylorsport. In 1836, James Taylor Jr. of Campbell County established a ferry here and named the town after himself. Over the years, Taylorsport has lost a street, a row of houses, and a cemetery to the waters of the Ohio River.

Geography
Taylorsport is just north of Interstate 275, Exit 8. Sayler Park is on the other side of the Ohio River, north of Taylorsport. This is where the ferry crossing from Taylorsport went. Kentucky Route 8 runs right through Taylorsport as well.

Natural disasters

When the devastating tornado of 1974, part of the 1974 Super Outbreak, hit Sayler Park it also hit Taylorsport. It destroyed Morehead Marine Service, damaged 50 homes and 20 barns, 186 boats, and killed 50 dairy cows in both communities.

References

Unincorporated communities in Boone County, Kentucky
Unincorporated communities in Kentucky